Tengger may refer to:

 Kingdom of Tengger, a 15th-century Majapahit successor state, which gave its name to:
 Tengger mountain range, East Java
 Tenggerese people of Java, Indonesia
 Tengger massif, a geographic feature in East Java
 Bromo Tengger Semeru National Park located on the massif
 Tengger Caldera located in the park, which includes Mount Bromo
 Tengri (Mongolian: Тэнгэр, Tenger; Chinese: 腾格里, Mandarin:Ténggélǐ), a Turkic and Mongolian sky god, who gave his name to:
 Otgontenger, a mountain in Mongolia
 Tengger Desert, a desert in China
 Tengger (singer), a pop singer from Inner Mongolia
 Tengger Cavalry, a Mongolian folk-metal band